Hitnal is a village near Munirabad in the Koppal taluk of Koppal district in the Indian state of Karnataka. Hitnal is located east to District Headquarters Koppal.

Demographics
As of 2001 India census, Hitnal had a population of 4,762 with 2,377 males and 2,385 females and 873  Households.

See also
Gangavathi
Kukanapalli
Kushtagi
Hospet
Koppal

References

External links
www.koppal.nic.in

Villages in Koppal district